The 1997 All-Ireland Senior Ladies' Football Championship Final was the 24th All-Ireland Final and the deciding match of the 1997 All-Ireland Senior Ladies' Football Championship, an inter-county ladies' Gaelic football tournament for the top teams in Ireland.

Monaghan led 2–9 to 1–3 at half-time and won by two points in the end.

References

!
All-Ireland Senior Ladies' Football Championship Finals
All-Ireland
Waterford county ladies' football team matches
Monaghan county ladies' football team matches
All-Ireland